James B. Harvey served as the International Commissioner of Scouts Canada. In 1974, Harvey was awarded the 86th Bronze Wolf, the only distinction of the World Organization of the Scout Movement, awarded by the World Scout Committee for exceptional services to world Scouting.

Background
Prior to working the Scouts, Harvey had been an Air Vice-Marshal in Canada.

References

External links

Recipients of the Bronze Wolf Award
Year of birth missing
Scouting and Guiding in Canada